Serranía de Macuira is a mountain range in northern Colombia located in the municipality of Uribia, La Guajira. The Serrania de Macuira stands in the middle of the La Guajira Desert at   isolated from the Sierra Nevada de Santa Marta and the Eastern Ranges of the Colombian Andes. The range is a protected area; National Natural Park Macuira.

The area is home to numerous species of fauna and flora and due to its relatively high humidity caused by the trade winds and its proximity to the Caribbean sea it presents a forest of dwarf trees and cloud forests. The frog Allobates wayuu is only known from the Serranía de Macuira.

References

External links 
  National Natural Parks of Colombia: Macuira

Mountain ranges of Colombia
National parks of Colombia
Geography of La Guajira Department
Tourist attractions in La Guajira Department